Yang Jiawei (Chinese: 杨家威; Pinyin: Yáng Jiāwēi; born 4 January 1992) is a Chinese football player who currently plays for China League Two side Qingdao Jonoon.

Club career
Yang started his professional football career in 2010 when he joined Chinese Super League side Nanchang Hengyuan. On 4 May 2011, he made his senior debut in the first round of 2011 Chinese FA Cup which Nanchang beat Beijing Institute of Technology 3–1. His Super League debut came on 31 July 2011, in a 1–0 home victory against Dalian Shide, coming on as a substitute for Pan Chaoran in the 59th minute. He followed the club to move to Shanghai in 2012. Yang scored his first senior goal on 17 June 2012, which ensured Shanghai Shenxin tied with Dalian Shide 1–1.

On 14 February 2016, Yang transferred to fellow Chinese Super League side Jiangsu Suning after Shanghai Shenxin's relegatione. He made his debut for Jiangsu on 15 March 2016 in a 0–0 away draw against FC Tokyo, coming on as a substitute for Ji Xiang in the 78th minute.

Career statistics 
Statistics accurate as of match played 31 December 2020.

References

External links
 

1992 births
Living people
Chinese footballers
Footballers from Zhejiang
People from Taizhou, Zhejiang
Shanghai Shenxin F.C. players
Jiangsu F.C. players
Chinese Super League players
China League Two players
Association football midfielders